Abyssotrophon delicatus is a species of sea snail, a marine gastropod mollusk in the family Muricidae, the murex snails or rock snails.

Description
The shell of an adult shell varies between 6 mm and 12 mm.

Distribution
This species occurs in the Pacific Ocean off Japan.

References

 Egorov R.V. 1994. New data on the taxonomy of molluscs of the family Trophoninae (Gastropoda, Muricidae) from the northwestern Pacific. Ruthenica 4(2): 97–101.
 Hasegawa K. (2009) Upper bathyal gastropods of the Pacific coast of northern Honshu, Japan, chiefly collected by R/V Wakataka-maru. In: T. Fujita (ed.), Deep-sea fauna and pollutants off Pacific coast of northern Japan. National Museum of Nature and Science Monographs 39: 225–383.

External links
 

Abyssotrophon
Gastropods described in 1953